Zundel is both a given name and a surname. Notable people with the name include:

Zundel Kroizer (1924-2014), Israeli rabbi and author
Zundel Salant (1786–1866), Ashkenazi rabbi
Claus Zundel, German composer
Enoch Zundel ben Joseph (died 1867), Russian Talmudist
Ernst Zündel (1939–2017), German publisher and Holocaust denier, the subject of the Canadian legal case, R. v. Zundel
Georg Zundel (1931–2007), German chemist, for whom the Zundel cation is named
Georg Friedrich Zundel (1875–1948), German painter
George Lorenzo Zundel (1885–1950), American mycologist
John Zundel (1815–1882), American composer
Maurice Zundel (1887–1975), Swiss theologian
Thomas Zündel (born 1987), Austrian footballer

German-language surnames